Steven Downes (born 22 November 1961 in Waterloo, London, England) is a British sports journalist, television producer and a contributing writer for the Sunday Herald.

English sports journalists
People from Lambeth
1961 births
Living people